The Cheraman Juma Mosque (Malayalam: ചേരമാൻ ജുമാ മസ്ജിദ്‌) (Arabic: مسجد الرئيس جمعة) is a mosque in Methala, Kodungallur, Thrissur in the Indian state of Kerala. A legend claims that it was built in 629 CE, which makes it the oldest mosque in the Indian subcontinent which is still in use. It was built on the orders of the successor of Cheraman Perumal, the Chera King of modern-day Kerala. The mosque was constructed in Kerala style with hanging lamps, making the historicity of its date claims more convincing.

The mosque was destroyed by the Portuguese in 1504 when Lopo Soares de Albergaria attacked the port of Kodungallur. The old building was built some time after the 1504 de Algabaria attack (i.e., from mid-16th to the early 17th century). Modern corridors and halls were built in 1984. The 1984 extensions, which surround the old building, conceal almost all of the exterior features of the old building.

History

According to some legends, Cheraman Perumal ("Cheraman Perumal" being the title held by Chera kings) witnessed the splitting of the moon, a supernatural event mentioned in the Quran as a miracle performed by Muhammad when asked for one by Meccan unbelievers. The bewildered King confirmed with his astrologers that the incident had taken place, but didn't know what to make of it. Arab merchants who had arrived at a Malabar port, a bustling global marketplace, sought audience with the King to have his permission to visit Ceylon. In conversation with them, the King learnt about Muhammad, made his son the regent of his kingdom and travelled back with the Arab merchants to meet the man himself.

The story goes that Cheraman Perumal arrived in Arabia with a gift of ginger pickles for Muhammad and his companions and converted to Islam "at the feet of Prophet Muhammad".

According to historian M.G.S. Narayanan, "there is no reason to reject the tradition that the last Chera king embraced Islam and went to Mecca, since it finds its place not only in Muslim chronicles, but also in Hindu brahmanical chronicles like the Keralolpatti, which need not be expected to concoct such a tale which in no way enhances the prestige of the Brahmins or Hindu population."

The history of the mosque has given it many architectural quirks including that since it was a repurpose Buddhist shrine, until its reconstruction in 1000 CE the mosque faced East instead of towards the Kaaba. Even today the mosque still includes some remnants of the shrine, including a traditional pond and a lamp that is said to have been burning for a thousand years, with oil that is brought for it by visitors and pilgrims of all religions.

Location
Masjid is located in the Paravur–Kodungalloor Road, NH-66 at Kodungalloor taluk, Thrissur District in Kerala.

Ceremonies

Vidyarambham 
The ceremony of Vidyarambham (Vidya means "knowledge", arambham means "beginning'), held typically on Vijayadashami, is a Hindu tradition to initiate their children into learning under the supervision of a learned person like a priest. At Cheraman Masjid, this ceremony is performed by the mosque's Muslim Imam, who traces the alphabet drawn in the sand on a child's tongue, indicating an invocation to Saraswati, the Hindu goddess of learning.

Appointment of the Aven (Priest) 
According to Chellikkattil Sundaran, president of the temple trust, the aven (priest) of Shobhaparamba Sreekurumba Bhagavati temple in Tanur, Malappuram, is traditionally appointed from the local Thiyya family by a member of the Brahmin family of Pazhayakhath Ilom. The family disintegrated over the years and its remaining members converted to Islam but both the temple authorities and the family upheld the tradition. The temple's Hindu priest is appointed in a special ritual once every 12 years, presided over by a Muslim member of the Pazhayakath family, who makes the formal announcement. Locals ascribe this camaraderie to Cheraman Perumal.

Maharajahs of Travancore 
The legend of the "Makkattupoya Perumal" or "the King who went to Makkah (Mecca)" has lived on in Kerala memory and apparently, the Maharajahs of the Princedom of Travancore in pre-Independence India would say at their swearing in, "I will keep this sword until the uncle who has gone to Makkah returns".

Famous visitors 

 A. P. J. Abdul Kalam, 11th President of India.
 Shashi Tharoor, Member of Parliament from Thiruvananthapuram, Kerala.

See also
 Islam in India
 Tamil Muslim
 Muslim chronicles for Indian history
 Muziris Heritage Project
Baba Ratan Hindi

References

Mosques in Kerala
History of Thrissur district
Miracles attributed to Muhammad
Tourist attractions in Thrissur district
7th-century mosques
Religious buildings and structures in Thrissur district
Grand mosques
History of Islam in India